Dona Ruth Anne Torr (April 28, 1883January 8, 1957) was a British Marxist historian, and a major influence on the famous Communist Party Historians Group. Aside from her translations of many Marxist classics into English, she is perhaps best known for her unfinished biography of the important labour activist, Tom Mann, Tom Mann and his Times (London, 1956).

Early life
Dona Torr was the daughter of William Torr, afterwards vicar of Eastham and Hon. Canon of Chester Cathedral. She had three sisters and two younger brothers. The Torr family was listed in Burke's Landed Gentry and her grandfather, John Torr, had been a wealthy merchant in Liverpool, a Conservative M.P., and staunch Anglican. Dona attended University College, London, on and off, completing a BA Honours degree in English before the First World War.

Career
Before the formation of the Communist Party Torr was a librarian at the Daily Herald (run by George Lansbury), where she met her future husband, Walter Holmes. In 1920, she was a founder member (albeit not a prominent one) of the Communist Party of Great Britain. Thereafter she worked in behind-the-scenes roles, aiding with party publications, and acting as a courier during the General Strike in London in 1926. She also travelled to Moscow as a translator for the Fifth Congress of the Communist International where the proceedings were largely conducted in German, which was her main linguistic skill, it is unlikely she was fluent in Russian. She also was to do work at the Marx-Engels Institute, where she translated into English the official Soviet German language edition of the Correspondence of Marx and Engels (London, 1934). This made her name as something of a Marxist scholar back in Britain, and she was thereafter to oversee the preparation of a special facsimile edition of Marx's Capital for George Allen and Unwin.

Torr worked at the party publishing house, Martin Lawrence (the initials, "M.L.", being an allusion to Marx and Lenin), which later merged with a leftist literary firm to become Lawrence and Wishart, where she was to work closely with former poet Douglas Garman. To celebrate the tercentenary of the English Revolution of 1640, in 1940, they commissioned young Oxford don, Christopher Hill to edit a set of three essays English Revolution, possibly connected with the plans for a "Faculty of History" at the party training centre, Marx House in London. This was intended 

Her husband, Walter Holmes, was a journalist on the Daily Herald and during the 1920s for the Communist Party, he worked on the Sunday Worker and during the 1930s was to be a significant and politically orthodox writer for the Daily Worker with postings in Russia, and even visiting Manchuria to cover the Japanese attacks on China, which he recounted in Eyewitness in Manchuria, it is possible that Dona Torr went with him. However, she seldom wrote any material for the main papers published by the party, and only occasionally wrote for party journals such as Labour Monthly, controlled by Party leader Rajani Palme Dutt.

Influence
As early as 1936, Torr had set herself the task of promoting historical study in the party. She had begun work on her Tom Mann biography, publishing an interim booklet in 1936. She wrote to the party ideologue, Palme Dutt, that she saw the need to "breed new historians, awaken and train them". She was active in forming a "Marxist Historians' Group" in 1938, and the later "Historians' Group" in 1946.

One of those most generous in his praise of Torr was E.P. Thompson, who spent many years working closely with her on a biography of William Morris, which was published by the party. At that stage in his party career, he was best known, not as an historian, but as a prominent member of the party's Writers' Group. He described his gratitude to Dona Torr in the "Preface":

While there can be no doubt of her assiduousness, what sort of actual "influence" she had on Thompson's later methodological developments in history is debatable. Rightly famed for his main pioneering works of "History From Below" (or "From the Bottom Up"), Thompson's first major work, Morris, shows little if any such techniques or approaches. His major work, The Making of the English Working Class, was penned well after Torr's death, many years after he had left the party in a blaze of acrimony.

Other well-known academic members of the party's Historians' Group, including Christopher Hill and John Saville, published a collection of essays in her honour, Democracy and the Labour Movement, many other members sought to contribute, but there were too many. Hill, one of those most fond of Torr, wrote the "Preface" for the editorial team and it is often quoted as evidence of her impact on the whole Group:

Much of her work with these young academic historians in the party was to promote their use of Marxist analysis in the then nascent field of "Labour History" – and especially to give it a Communist spin. As both "Prefaces" state, she was very generous with her time, and when draft work was sent to her she made a major effort to check it and comment accordingly. In this sense she was an ideal type of "editor for young writers, who due to hostility to Communism could usually only have their work published by the party publisher Lawrence and Wishart, by its wholly owned subsidiary "Cobbett Press", or by a few allied firms, such as "Frederick Muller".

Apart from a sophisticated grasp of Marxism–Leninism, she showed no signs of adopting original methodologies, nor showed a remarkable use of archives in her other works. There is also no evidence of an attempt to pioneer oral history in her own main work with Tom Mann as she researched with him on the biography of him for the party's commemorative efforts with the old veteran. She cannot be seen as the founder of a new style of historical research, unlike Georges Lefebvre or the Annales School in France.

Nonetheless, one form of enduring organisational influence stemmed from Torr's circle, from the creation by Historians' Group members of two offshoots: the academic journal Past & Present, and, later, the Labour History Review. The former went on to create an associated society, more often associated with medieval and early modern studies. After her death, the "Moderns" (a sub-section of the group) reached out to others to form the Society of Labour History, which survives to the present day, and publishes a distinguished journal of its own. Indirectly, the Historians' Group which she helped to found, and its members, also led to the formation of History Workshop and to other leftist conferences and events to further the study of history in Britain. Often rejected by the mainstream of academic historians, these efforts by successors of Torr and her Historians' Group, have persisted, some in adult education, or precariously on the edges of academe, but they have never died out, crafting a wide variety of cultural studies, feminist works, and more traditional labour histories.

In 2017, she featured in a conference, London's Women Historians, held at the Institute of Historical Research.

Selected articles/works
 Tom Mann (1936) (a Communist Party booklet for his 80th birthday celebrations)
 "Correspondence: Marx and Engels" (1934), translated by Torr from the approved Soviet German language version.
 Marxism, nationality and war / a text-book (editor) (1940)
 Marxism and war (1943)
 History in the making (General Editor) (1948) (4 volumes – real editors of vols. 2, 3 & 4 were J. Jeffreys, C. Hill & E. Dell, E. Hobsbawm)
 Tom Mann and his Times, vol. 1 (1956) (prepared for publication after her illness by Christopher Hill and A.L. Morton.)
 Democracy and the Labour Movement. Essays in honour of D. Torr (edited by John Saville ("Editorial Secretary"), Christopher Hill, George Thomson and Maurice Dobb) (1954)
 "Tom Mann and his Times, 1890–92," originally in the CPGB "Our History" series of booklets, later as a chapter in Lionel Munby (ed.), The Luddites and Other Essays, (London, 1971)

References

 Dr Antony Howe, The Past Is Ours, PhD dissertation, (University of Sydney, 2004)
 Dr Antony Howe, "Dona Torr," Dictionary of Labour Biography
 "J.K.", (James Klugmann), obituary "A Tribute to Dona Torr", World News, Vol 4 No. 4, 26 January 1957, p. 55
 Allen Hutt, on Torr, an article-obituary, Labour Monthly, March 1957, 
 Obituary (of William Torr), The Times, (London) Sept., 24th, 1924, p. 14
 Dorothy Thompson, Outsiders: Class, Gender and Nation, Verso, London and New York, (1993)

External links
The history woman by Dave Renton.
Page with some family history

1883 births
1957 deaths
Alumni of the University of London
British communists
British Marxists
British Marxist historians
German–English translators
Communist Party of Great Britain members
Communist Party Historians Group members
British women historians
English Revolution